Gadomus is a genus of rattails in the family Bathygadidae.

Species
The 13 currently recognized species in this genus are:
 Gadomus aoteanus McCann & McKnight, 1980 (filamentous rattail)
 Gadomus arcuatus (Goode & T. H. Bean, 1886) (doublethread grenadier)
 Gadomus capensis (Gilchrist & von Bonde, 1924)
 Gadomus colletti D. S. Jordan & C. H. Gilbert, 1904
 Gadomus denticulatus C. H. Gilbert & C. L. Hubbs, 1920
 Gadomus dispar (Vaillant, 1888)
 Gadomus filamentosus (H. M. Smith & Radcliffe, 1912)
 Gadomus introniger C. H. Gilbert & C. L. Hubbs, 1920 (blackmouth rattail)
 Gadomus longifilis (Goode & T. H. Bean, 1885) (threadfin grenadier)
 Gadomus magnifilis C. H. Gilbert & C. L. Hubbs, 1920
 Gadomus melanopterus C. H. Gilbert, 1905
 Gadomus multifilis (Günther, 1887)
 Gadomus pepperi Iwamoto & A. Williams, 1999 (blacktongue rattail)

References 

Marine fish genera
Gadiformes
Extant Miocene first appearances